The 2019 El Paso Locomotive FC season is the inaugural season for El Paso Locomotive FC in the USL Championship, the second-tier professional soccer league in the United States and Canada.

Club

Roster

Competitions

Preseason

USL Championship

Standings

Match results

The 2019 USL Championship season schedule for the club was announced on December 19, 2018.

Unless otherwise noted, all times in MST

USL Cup Playoffs

U.S. Open Cup

As a member of the USL Championship, El Paso entered the tournament in the Second Round.

References

El Paso Locomotive FC
El Paso
El Paso
El Paso Locomotive